Pareiorhaphis cerosus is a species of catfish in the family Loricariidae. It is a freshwater fish native to South America, where it occurs in coastal drainage basins in eastern Brazil. The species reaches 11 cm (4.3 inches) in standard length and is believed to be a facultative air-breather.

References 

Loricariidae
Catfish of South America
Freshwater fish of Brazil
Fish described in 1951